Tunde Babalola, is a scriptwriter in Nigerian cinema and British television series. He is most notable for the script writing of critically acclaimed movies such as  Last Flight to Abuja, Critical Assignment, October 1 and Citation.

Personal life
He was born and grew up in England. Later, he moved to Nigeria with his parents and siblings. His father was an accountant and his mother worked in the Central Bank. Under the guidance of his uncle, a Lieutenant-Colonel in the Nigerian Army, Babalola forced to apply to the Nigerian Defence Academy (NDA). However, his mother did not give him permission. Therefore, he gained admission to study Dramatic Arts at the Obafemi Awolowo University.

Career
At the age of 14, he wrote his first film script In The Raw. After he returned to the United Kingdom, he joined with Channel 4 and wrote the play for sitcom series called In Exile. He later worked with several channels: BBC, Carlton Television and Chrysalis Television.

Babalola started as a writer with the TV serial The Bill. After the serial received fan popularity, he wrote the three TV serials in 1997: True to Life Player, Crime of a Lesser Passion and Armed and Dangerous. In 1998, he wrote the serial One Man, Two Faces. Later in 2002, he made maiden cinema appearance as an actor with the horror film Deep Freeze. He played the role as a helicopter pilot.

In 2014, he wrote the script of critically acclaimed blockbuster October 1, where he took four weeks to write the first draft of the film and three drafts only took about a week to complete. The script was initially submitted with the title Dust, mainly because the story is set in a very dusty town. Even though Afolayan didn't want to do big budget projects at the time, he knew he had no choice, as he wanted to interpret the writer's vision adequately because it is a "national film with a universal appeal". He expressed that he liked the story of October 1 because it is a period piece, which he had never done before and "it is also significant to the present state of Nigeria". As a result, he decided to explore the film by adding his own ideas to the subsequent drafts of the script.

In 2015, he joined as the writer and producer of the comedy TV production Rib Busters: Comedy Show. In 2015, Babalola won the awards for the Best Comedy Writer for the film The meeting and Best Drama Writer for the film October 1 at  Africa Magic Viewers’ Choice Awards.

Filmography

References

External links
 

Living people
Nigerian male film actors
Year of birth missing (living people)
Nigerian screenwriters
British screenwriters
21st-century Nigerian male actors
Obafemi Awolowo University alumni